Ellscott is a hamlet in northern Alberta, Canada within Athabasca County. It was named after L.G. Scott, a purchasing agent for the Alberta and Great Waterways Railway.

Demographics 

As a designated place in the 2016 Census of Population conducted by Statistics Canada, Ellscott had a population of 10 living in 5 of its 6 total private dwellings, an increase from its 2011 population of 0.

See also 
List of communities in Alberta
List of designated places in Alberta
List of hamlets in Alberta

References 

Athabasca County
Hamlets in Alberta
Designated places in Alberta